Andrew Duran (born September 26, 1989) is a former American soccer player.

Career

College and Amateur
Duran spent his college career at Creighton University.  He didn't see much action in 2007 and 2008 due to multiple injuries.  In 2009, Duran made 14 appearances for the Bluejays and picked up his only point of the season on an assist against Eastern Illinois on October 11, 2009.  In 2010, Duran was awarded a medical redshirt after picking up a season ending knee injury in the fifth game of the season.  In 2011, Duran started all 24 matches at left center back and helped lead Creighton to a 21-2-1 regular season record.  He went on to become NSCAA All-America Second-Team, NSCAA Midwest Region First-Team, College Soccer News All-America First-Team, MVC Defensive Player of the Year, First-Team All-MVC, MVC All-Tournament Team and MVC Scholar-Athlete First Team. WITTL all world performer & 5x WITTL player of the month.

During his college years, Duran also played for USL Premier Development League club Chicago Fire Premier in 2008 and 2010, and with Des Moines Menace in 2011.

Professional
On January 12, 2012, Duran was drafted in the first round (15th overall) of the 2012 MLS SuperDraft by Seattle Sounders FC.  Two months later, the Sounders signed Duran to a professional contract.

On June 15, 2012, Duran was loaned out to Atlanta Silverbacks of the North American Soccer League.  He made seven appearances during his stint with Atlanta before suffering a torn ACL which ruled him out for the rest of the season.

On April 19, 2013, Duran was waived by the Sounders to make way for rookie forward Will Bates.

International
Duran played for the United States Under 17 team at the Ballymena International Tournament in Northern Ireland in 2005. Duran played all 3 opening round games against Slovakia, Israel and Northern Ireland - scoring a goal in the game against Northern Ireland.

Career statistics

References

External links
 
 
 Creighton University bio

1989 births
Living people
American soccer players
Creighton Bluejays men's soccer players
Chicago Fire U-23 players
Des Moines Menace players
Seattle Sounders FC players
Atlanta Silverbacks players
Association football defenders
Soccer players from Illinois
Seattle Sounders FC draft picks
USL League Two players
North American Soccer League players
United States men's youth international soccer players
People from Mokena, Illinois